The 2007 British National Track Championships were a series of track cycling competitions held from 2–6 October 2007 at the Manchester Velodrome. They are organised and sanctioned by British Cycling, and were open to British cyclists.>

Medal summary

Men's Events

Women's Events

References

National Track Championships
British National Track Championships